Choszczewo may refer to the following places:
Choszczewo, Łódź Voivodeship (central Poland)
Choszczewo, Podlaskie Voivodeship (north-east Poland)
Choszczewo, Warmian-Masurian Voivodeship (north Poland)